Dango is a Japanese rice-based  dumpling.

Dango may additionally refer to:

 Dango, Burkina Faso, a town in Boulgou Province, Burkina Faso
 Dango, drummer for American punk band Amber Pacific
Odango, Japanese slang for bun (hairstyle)
Dango, a derogatory term  used by go players internationally referring to an inefficient, dumpling-like cluster of stones in a go game
 Dangō, Japanese word for bid rigging
 Dango, a font used within the 1998 Windows adventure game Grim Fandango
 Dango, a light Emirati dish of boiled chickpeas
 Dango, alternate name of Dangon, a village in India

See also
 Dirty Dango, American professional wrestler
 Dangu (disambiguation)
 DAMGO, a synthetic opioid